Zhengzhou, also spelt  Zheng Zhou and alternatively romanized as Chengchow, is the capital and largest city of Henan Province in the central part of the People's Republic of China. Located in north-central Henan, it is one of the National Central Cities in China, the centre of Central Plains area, and serves as the political, economic, technological, and educational center of the province. The Zhengzhou metropolitan area (including Zhengzhou and Kaifeng) is the core area of the Central Plains Economic Zone.

The city lies on the southern bank of the Yellow River. Zhengzhou is a major hub of China's national transportation network, with railways connecting Zhengzhou to Europe and an international airport. As of 2020, there are two World Cultural Heritage Sites in Zhengzhou. The Zhengzhou Commodity Exchange (ZCE) is China's first futures exchange. Zhengzhou Airport Economy Zone is China's first Airport Economy Zone.

As of the 2020 Chinese census, the prefecture-level city of Zhengzhou had a population of 12,600,574 inhabitants, whom 10,260,667 lived in its built-up (or metro) area made of 6 urban districts plus Zhongmu county, Xinzheng and Xingyang cities now largely being conurbated. The city had a total GDP of 1.014 trillion (RMB) in 2018. Greater Zhengzhou was named as one of the 13 emerging mega-cities in China in a July 2012 report by the Economist Intelligence Unit, and officially named as the eighth National Central City in 2017 by the central government in Beijing.

Zhengzhou is a major city for scientific research, appearing among the world's top 100 cities as tracked by the Nature Index. The city is home to several national key universities in China, notably Zhengzhou University, Henan University, Henan Agricultural University, Henan University of Chinese Medicine, and Henan University of Technology.

History

The Shang dynasty established Aodu or Bodu in Zhengzhou. This prehistorical city had become abandoned as ruins long before the First Emperor of China in BC 260. Since 1950, archaeological finds in a walled city in Eastern Zhengzhou have provided evidence of Shang dynasty settlements in the area around BC 1600. Outside this city, remains of large public buildings and a complex of small settlements have been discovered. The site is generally identified with the Shang capital of Ao and is preserved in the Shang dynasty Ruins monument in Guanchen District. The Shang, who continually moved their capital due to frequent natural disasters, left Ao at around 13th century BC. The site, nevertheless, remained occupied; Zhou (post-1050 BC) tombs have also been discovered. Legend suggests that in the Western Zhou period (1111–771 BC) the site became the fief of a family named Guan. From this derives the name borne by the county (xian) since the late 6th century BC—Guancheng (City of the Guan). The city first became the seat of a prefectural administration in AD 587, when it was named Guanzhou. In 605 it was first called Zhengzhou—a name by which it has been known virtually ever since.

The name Zhengzhou came from the Sui dynasty (AD 582), even though it was located in Chenggao, another town. The government moved to the contemporary city during the Tang dynasty. It achieved its greatest importance under the Sui (AD 581–618), Tang (618–907), and early Song (960–1127) dynasties, when it was the terminus of the New Bian Canal, which joined the Yellow River to the northwest. There, at a place called Heyin, a vast granary complex was established to supply the capitals at Luoyang and Chang'an to the west and the frontier armies to the north. In the Song period, however, the transfer of the capital eastward to Kaifeng robbed Zhengzhou of much of its importance.

In 1903 the Beijing–Hankou Railway arrived at Zhengzhou, and in 1909 the first stage of the Longhai Railway gave it an east–west link to Kaifeng and Luoyang; it later was extended eastward to the coast at Lianyungang, Jiangsu, and westward to Xi'an (Chang'an), Shaanxi, as well as to western Shaanxi. Zhengzhou thus became a major rail junction and a regional center for cotton, grain, peanuts, and other agricultural produce.  Early in 1923 a workers' strike began in Zhengzhou and spread along the rail line before it was suppressed; a 14-story double tower in the center of the city commemorates the strike. On June 10, 1938, Chiang Kai-shek's National Revolutionary Army opened up the dikes retaining the Yellow River at Huayuankou between Zhengzhou and Kaifeng, in an effort to stem the tide of invading Japanese; however, the ensuing 1938 Yellow River flood also killed hundreds of thousands of Chinese.

Zhengzhou also has a locomotive and rolling-stock repair plant, a tractor-assembly plant, and a thermal generating station. The city's industrial growth has resulted in a large increase in the population, coming predominantly from industrial workers from the north. A water diversion project and pumping station, built in 1972, has provided irrigation for the surrounding countryside.  The city has an agricultural university.

In July 2021, record breaking floods left over a million people displaced  and at least 300 people dead.

Geography

Located just north of the province's centre and south of the Yellow River, Zhengzhou borders Luoyang to the west, Jiaozuo to the northwest, Xinxiang to the northeast, Kaifeng to the east, Xuchang to the southeast, and Pingdingshan to the southwest. With the land within its administrative borders generally sloping down from west to east, Zhengzhou is situated at the transitional zone between the North China Plain to the east and the Song Mountains and Xionger Mountains to the west, which are part of the greater Qinling range. The city centre is situated to the south of the middle reach of the Yellow River, where its valley broadens into the great plain. Zhengzhou is at the crossing point of the north–south route skirting the Taihang Mountains and the mountains of western Henan.

A section of the Yellow River passes by the northern edges of the urban area, extending  within Zhengzhou prefecture. However, Jialu River, a secondary tributary of the Huai River, is Zhengzhou's main urban river and flood channel. The Jialu enters Zhengzhou from Xinmi to the southwest, and turns to the southeast within the city. Mountains loom over the western counties of Gongyi and Dengfeng while the easternmost county of Zhongmu is a vast, fertile floodplain, with the counties in between being hilly transitions.

Climate
Zhengzhou experiences a monsoon-influenced, four-season humid subtropical climate (Köppen climate classification Cwa), with cool, dry winters and hot, humid summers. Spring and autumn are dry and somewhat abbreviated transition periods. The frost-free period lasts on average 220 days.

Rainfall is primarily produced by the monsoonal low during summer; in winter, when the vast Siberian High dominates due to radiative cooling from further north, the area receives little precipitation. During the summer season, the city is also often affected by tropical depressions, which bring additional amounts of rain. With monthly percent possible sunshine ranging from 45 percent in February and March to 54 percent in May, the city receives 2,182 hours of sunshine per year, which is just under half the possible total.

2021 Flood
On July 20, 2021, "The heaviest hour of rainfall ever reliably recorded in China crashed like a miles-wide waterfall over the city of Zhengzhou on July 20, killing at least 300 people, including 14 who drowned in a subway tunnel." Although an emergency alert was issued the day before the flood, businesses and subways remained open. From 4pm to 5pm on July 21, 7.95 inches of rain fell. A collapsed retaining wall allowed water to pour into subway tunnels. "The Chinese government now appears to be acknowledging missteps by local officials, as well as the possibility that severe weather events will become increasingly common."

Administration and demography

Zhengzhou is divided into 6 urban districts, 5 county-level cities and 1 county. These subdivisions are likely to undergo significant changes in the near future due to increasingly rapid urban expansion and urban planning.

The municipality is home to 8,626,505 inhabitants (2010 census) and 6,35 million in its built up area made of 6 urban and suburban districts, Xingyang and Xinzheng cities and now Zhongmu county largely being urbanized, making the city one of the main built-up areas of the province.

Main sights

Zhengzhou was the capital of China during the Shang dynasty. Parts of the Shang-era capital city wall that were built 3,600 years ago still remain in Downtown Zhengzhou (see Zhengzhou Shang City). Zhengzhou maintains abundant cultural heritages that reflect its history as well as the culture of Henan Province. Zhengzhou Confucius Temple, initially built during the Eastern Han dynasty 1900 years ago, is one of the oldest Confucian Temples in China. Other important architectural heritage sites in the city center include Town God Temple and Erqi Memorial Tower.

The Shaolin Monastery is not only known as one of China's most important Buddhist shrines, but also as the ancient center of Chinese Kung-fu. Shaolin Monastery and its famed Pagoda Forest were inscribed as a UNESCO World Heritage Site in 2010.

The Henan Museum is one of China's most important museums. It has a collection of more than 130,000 pieces of cultural relics includes exhibitions from prehistoric times, including dinosaur fossils and prehistoric human remains, up through the modern eras.

Zhengzhou's most developed and modern area is the Zhengdong New Area, which is in the eastern part of the city. The tallest structure in Zhengzhou is the 388-meter height Zhongyuan Tower, located on Hanghai East Road in the south of Zhengdong New Area. It is used as a television tower, with a revolving restaurant and an observation deck. The tower is among the tallest towers in the world.

Zhengzhou Zoo is located on Huayuan Road.

The newly built Zhengzhou Botanic Garden is at the western edge of Zhengzhou city.

Main attractions of Zhengzhou include:

 Mount Song (UNESCO Global Geopark)
 Shaolin Monastery and Pagoda Forest (UNESCO World Heritage Site)
 Dengfeng Observatory (UNESCO World Heritage Site)
 Songyue Pagoda (UNESCO World Heritage Site)
 Yellow River Scenic Area

 Mausoleums of the Song dynasty

 Kang Baiwan's Mansion

 the birthplace of Yellow Emperor
 Erqi Memorial Tower
 Henan Museum
 Zhongyuan Tower
 Zhengzhou Shang City

Economy

Zhengzhou, along with Xi'an, Chengdu, Chongqing and Wuhan, are some of the most economically important cities in inland China. Zhengzhou is the economic center of the province and the surrounding areas such as southeastern Shanxi and southwestern Shandong. Due to its strategic location in one of the most populous areas in the world (nearly 100 million people in Henan alone) and in China's railway, road and aviation transport networks, Zhengzhou is increasingly attracting domestic and international investment as well as migrants from other areas, transforming the city into one of the largest economic centers in China. In 2018, total GDP of Zhengzhou was ￥1020 billion, ranked 17th in China. And in 2021,  total GDP was￥1269.1 billion, ranked 16th in China.

Agriculture
By the end of 2006, Zhengzhou had a total population of over 7 million, of which 2.88 million lived in rural areas.  Its main products include apples, paulownia, tobacco, maize, cotton, and wheat.  In addition, Zhengzhou also produces Yellow River carp, Zhengzhou watermelons, Xinzheng jujube, Xingyang dried persimmons, Guangwu Pomegranate and Zhongmu garlic, all of which are specialties that are rarely found outside the region.

Mining and manufacturing
Zhengzhou and the surrounding area have large reserves of coal and other minerals. Coal mining and electricity generation are traditionally important in the local economy.

Zhengzhou has been one of the major industrial cities in The People's Republic of China since 1949.  The city's staple industry is textiles. Others manufactured items include tractors, locomotives, cigarettes, fertilizer, processed meats, agricultural machinery, and electrical equipment. Some high-tech companies in new material, electronics and biotechnology are also growing rapidly during the recently years, especially in the high-tech industrial park in the northwest of the city. 
Yutong, China's largest bus producer.
Shaolin Bus, a well-known small-to-medium-sized bus producer.
Zhengzhou Nissan, a subsidiary of Dongfeng Nissan, specializing in the manufacture of SUVs and pickup trucks. In 2010, Nissan opened its second plant in the city.
Haima Automobile Zhengzhou, an automobile manufacturer specializing in manufacturing microvans and light passenger vehicles.
Zhengzhou Unique Industrial Equipment Co., Ltd., a large tractor and agricultural equipment manufacturer.
Foxconn Zhengzhou, located in Zhengzhou Airport Economy Zone, is the largest smartphone production site in the world and is also known as "iPhone City".
Sanquan Food, a frozen food company. With over 20000 employees, Sanquan produced the first frozen dumplings and rice balls in China.
Synear Food Holdings Limited, along with Sanquan Food, is one of the largest producers of frozen food in China. The market share is over 20% in China

Services
The service industries of Zhengzhou include retail, wholesale, hospitality, finance, exhibition, transport and delivery, tourism, and education. With a number of domestic and international institutions having regional offices in the city, Zhengzhou is becoming the financial center in central China. Zhengzhou Commodity Exchange (ZCE) is one of the only four future exchanges (inc. Shanghai Futures Exchange and Dalian Commodity Exchange and China Financial Futures Exchange) in China and is becoming an important global player specialised in agricultural future exchange. Equipped with newly built facilities such as Zhengzhou International Conference and Exhibition Center. Third party logistics (3PL) in Zhengzhou has also been experiencing industrial boom during the past few years. As a transit and tourist center of Henan Province and central China, Zhengzhou is the center of Henan cuisine.
Dennis, a regional retail chain.
Henan Jianye, a large real estate developer, which owns the China Super League club Henan Jianye F.C.

Economic development zones
The Zhengdong New Area, literally Eastern Zhengzhou New Area, similar to Hangzhou Bay New Area in Ningbo and Hengqin New Area in Zhuhai, is one of dozens of major economic zones that are currently developing in various regions of China. Established in 2003 by the provincial and municipal governments, it has become the financial center of Henan province and one of the most rapidly growing areas of China.

Kisho Kurokawa, a Japanese world-renowned planner and architect, was appointed to design the overall planning scheme for Zhengdong New Area. He brought in advanced ideas including ecological city, co-existing city, metabolic city and ring city ideas. The scheme won the "Prominent Award for City Planning Design" at the first session of Annual Meeting of the World Architects Alliance in 2002. Zhengdong New Area is mainly constituted by the CBD area, the Longhu commercial and residential area, the Longzihu college area, and the Zhengzhou East railway station commercial area.

Industrial zones
 Zhengzhou New & Hi-Tech Industries Development Zone
Zhengzhou High & New Technology Industries Development Zone was established in 1988, and approved by the state Council of PRC to be a state development zone on Mar.6,1991. It was appraised to be advanced high tech zone of China respectively in 1993, 1998 and 2002. An extension plan was approved by Zhengzhou Municipal Government, the various construction work started in 2004. Under the development strategy of “multiple parks in one zone”, the Zone has been making great efforts to promote the development of software, information technologies, new materials, bio-pharmaceutical and photo-machinery-electronic industries.
 Zhengzhou Economic and Technological Development Zone

Zhengzhou Economic and Technological Development Zone was approved as state-level development zone on February 13, 2000. The zone has a developed area of  Industries encouraged include Electronics Assembly & Manufacturing, Telecommunications Equipment, Trading and Distribution, Biotechnology/Pharmaceuticals, Instruments & Industrial Equipment Production, Medical Equipment and Supplies, Shipping/Warehousing/Logistics and Heavy Industry.
 Zhengzhou Export Processing Area
Zhengzhou (Henan) Export Processing Zone was established on June 21, 2002 with approval by the state council. Zone A is located in Zhengzhou National Economic & technological Development Area and began to operate on June 1, 2004. Zone B is located in Zhengzhou Airport Area and is adjacent to Zhengzhou Xinzheng International Airport on the north and it covers a planned area of 5 square km with bonded logistics zone, bonded processing zone and supporting industry zone, etc.

Transportation
Zhengzhou is located in the central part of China and is a main national transport hub.

Public transit

Metro

The Zhengzhou Metro is a rapid transit metro rail network serving urban and suburban districts of Great Zhengzhou metropolitan. The Zhengzhou Metro system started operation on 28 December 2013. The first two lines (Line 1 and Line 2) were approved by the National Development and Reform Commission in Feb. 2009. Construction of the two lines started in 2009 and 2010, and were finished in 2013 and 2015 respectively. The Chengjiao Line (planned to be part of Line 9), which is now in through operations with Line 2, allows the system to serve the Zhengzhou Xinzheng International Airport. A total of 21 metro lines have been planned to connect all areas in Great Zhengzhou Metropolitan Area.

Bus

Zhengzhou has a bus system with over 5,700 bus vehicles, operated by the Zhengzhou Bus Communication Corporation (ZZB).

The operations of Zhengzhou Bus Rapid Transit commenced in 2009. The system consists of 5 main routes (B1, B2, B3, B5 and B6) with dedicated bus lanes and dozens of branch routes that serve most areas of the city.

Railways 

Zhengzhou is the junction of the Longhai Railway (Lianyungang, Jiangsu–Lanzhou, Gansu) and the Beijing–Guangzhou Railway as well as a major national railway hub. The main railway station for these conventional services is Zhengzhou railway station, opened in 1904.

Zhengzhou is also on the Beijing–Guangzhou–Shenzhen–Hong Kong high-speed railway and the Xuzhou–Lanzhou High-Speed Railway. The high-speed rail network provides fast train services to most major cities in China, including Beijing (2.5 hours), Guangzhou (6 hours), Xi'an (2 hours), Wuhan (2 hours), Shanghai (4 hours), Nanjing (3 hours), Hangzhou (5 hours), and Hong Kong (6.5 hours). Proposed high-speed railways from Zhengzhou to Chongqing, Hefei, Jinan and Taiyuan are under construction.

The completion of the Zhengzhou–Jinan high-speed railway, planned for 2023, will complete a star-shaped (referred to as a "米"-shaped) network of eight high-speed lines radiating out from the city.

Zhengzhou is also the hub of intercity railways in Henan. Currently there are three intercity railways from Zhengzhou: Zhengzhou–Kaifeng intercity railway, Zhengzhou–Jiaozuo intercity railway and Zhengzhou–Xinzheng Airport intercity railway are in operation.

Zhengzhou East railway station is dedicated to high-speed trains and is one of the largest in Asia and Zhengzhou South railway station is a new high-speed railway hub under construction.

Roads and Expressways

The surrounding area of Zhengzhou, along with the Yangtze River Delta, Pearl River Delta and the Bohai Economic Rim, has the highest highway density nationwide. Zhengzhou is the center of Henan expressway network that provides 1–2 hours road trip to surrounding cities of Kaifeng, Xinxiang, Xuchang, Jiaozuo and Luoyang. Other major cities within the province can be reached in 3 hours. The expressway network and national highways also links Zhengzhou to all major cities in the country.

There are several limited access express roads in the city center to relieve traffic problems. However, heavy congestion is still common in rush hours.

Expressways
  G4 Beijing–Hong Kong and Macau Expressway
  G30 Lianyungang–Khorgas Expressway
  G3001 Zhengzhou Ring Expressway
  S1 Zhengzhou Airport Expressway
  S32 Yongcheng–Dengfeng Expressway
  S49 Linzhou–Ruzhou Expressway
  S60 Shangqiu–Dengfeng Expressway
  S82 Zhengzhou–Minquan Expressway
  S85 Zhengzhou–Shaolinsi Expressway
  S87 Zhengzhou–Yuntaishan Expressway
  S88 Zhengzhou–Xixia Expressway
  S89 Zhengzhou Airport–Xihua Expressway

National highways
  China National Highway 107
  China National Highway 220
  China National Highway 310

Urban express roads
 3rd Ring Road (Zhengzhou)
 4th Ring Road (Zhengzhou)
 Jingguang Expressway
 Longhai Expressway
 Nongye Expressway
 Zhongzhou Avenue

Air

The airport is a focus city of China Southern Airlines, Lucky Air, West Air and Shenzhen Airlines. It used to be the headquarter for Henan Airlines. In 2017, it was the busiest airport in central China in both passenger and cargo traffic. It is also one of the eight air hubs nominated by the Civil Aviation Administration of China.

Other airports in Zhengzhou include Shangjie Airport (IATA: HSJ) which is for general aviation, and Matougang Airbase which is for military use.

Colleges and universities

Public

Zhengzhou University
Henan University(Longzi Lake campus)
Henan Agricultural University
Henan University of Technology (former Zhengzhou Institute of Technology)
Henan University of Finance and Economics
Zhongyuan Institute of Technology
Zhengzhou University of Light Industry
Zhengzhou Institute of Aeronautical Industry Management
North China Institute of Water Conservancy and Hydroelectric Power
Henan University of Traditional Chinese Medicine
Henan Textile University
Zhengzhou Normal University
Zhengzhou Institute of Technology (former Zhongzhou University, not to be confused with Henan University of Technology)
Henan Institute of architecture technology (河南建筑职业技术学院)

Military
PLA Information Engineering University (中国人民解放军信息工程大学)
Air Defense Force Command Academy

Private
Zhengzhou College of Economics
Huanghe S&T University（ZiJin Mountain Street Campus）（黄河科技大学）(紫金山南校区)
Sias International University
Shengda Economics, Trade and Management College of Zhengzhou

Notable people

Zichan (? – 552 BC), a politician and philosopher of the State of Zheng during the Spring and Autumn period.
Lie Yukou (c. 450 BC – ?), known as Liezi, a Taoism philosopher. 
Shen Buhai (c. 400 BC – c. 337 BC), a politician and philosopher in Legalism.
Han Fei (c. 280 BC – 233 BC), also known as Han Feizi, an influential political philosopher of the Warring States Period.
Du Fu (712–770), a Tang dynasty poet, born in Gongyi, now a county under the administration of Zhengzhou.
Bai Juyi (772–846), a Tang dynasty poet widely known for his poems featuring realism, born in Xinzheng.
Li Shangyin (c. 813–858), a late Tang dynasty poet, born in Xingyang.
Gao Gong (1512–1578), a politician of the Ming dynasty, born in Xinzheng.
Wei Wei (1920–2008), a modern era writer, widely known in China for his works on the Chinese Volunteer army's participation of the Korean War.
Chang Xiangyu (1923–2004), a Yu opera actress.
Li Na (born 1963), a Chinese folk singer.
Li Jianying (1964–2006), hero pilot.
Shi Yigong (born 1967), a biophysicist, president of Westlake University and the former vice president of Tsinghua University.
Hai Xia (born 1972), a Chinese news anchor for China Central Television, the main state announcer of China.
Deng Yaping (born 1973), a four-time table tennis Olympic champion.
Liu Yang (born 1978), a pilot and astronaut who became the first Chinese woman in space. 
Tie Ya Na (born 1979), a table tennis player representing Hong Kong, born in Zhengzhou.
Sun Tiantian (born 1981), a former professional tennis player on WTA Tour and 2004 Olympic Tennis champion (women's doubles with Li Ting), the first Chinese player to win a mixed doubles Grand Slam title at the 2008 Australian Open with Nenad Zimonjić.
Du Wei (born 1982), a professional footballer and the former captain of China national football team.
Jiang Xin (born 1983), an actress, famous for her role as Consort Hua in the TV series Empresses in the Palace.
Gao Lin (born 1986), a professional footballer.
Shi Xiaolong (born 1988), an actor.
Ning Zetao (born 1993), a competitive swimmer and gold medal winner at 2014 Asian Games and 2015 World Aquatics Championships.
Fan Pengfei (born 1992), a Chinese singer, songwriter and musician in pop music.

Politics
The current mayor is He Xiong from January 2022.

List of the CPC Party Chiefs of Zhengzhou:
Gu Jingsheng: October 1948 – December 1948
Wu Defeng: December 1948 – June 1949
Zhao Wucheng: June 1949 – April 1953
Song Zhihe: April 1953 – August 1956
Wang Lizhi: August 1956 – January 1968
Wang Hui: March 1971 – January 1974
Zhang Junqing: January 1974 – December 1977
Yu Yichuan: December 1977 – December 1979
Li Baoguang: December 1979 – May 1983
Jiang Jinfei: May 1983 – September 1984
Yao Minxue: September 1984 – August 1987
Cao Lei: August 1987 – July 1990
Song Guochen: July 1990 – May 1992
Zhang Deguang: May 1992 – December 1995
Wang Youjie: December 1995 – June 2001
Li Ke: June 2001– January 2006
Wang Wenchao （王文超）：January 2006 — July 2010
Lian Weiliang（连维良）：July 2010 — December 2012
Wu Tianjun（吴天君）：December 2012 — May 2016
Ma Yi（马懿）：May 2016 — June 2019
Xu Liyi（徐立毅）：June 2019 — January 2022
An Wei（安伟）：January 2022 —

Sister cities 
Zhengzhou is twinned with:

See also 
Zhengzhou Ostrich Park
Zhengzhou Shang City
History of Zhengzhou
List of historical capitals of China
Zhengzhou Ferris Wheel
Zhengzhou Foreign Language School

Notes

References

External links 

 Zhengzhou Government website 

 
Provincial capitals in China
Prefecture-level divisions of Henan